The Lillooet electoral district was a riding (provincial constituency) in the Canadian province of British Columbia, centred on the town of the same name and with various boundaries.  Originally with two members, the constituency was split into Lillooet West and Lillooet East in the 1894, 1898, and 1900 elections, with Lillooet West being recomprised as one riding (with only one member) in the 1903 election.

Political geography

The riding was one of the first created in British Columbia, and at the time the town of Lillooet was one of the largest in the province (it is now one of the smallest).  It was originally a two-member riding.  It waRegistered Voters
!align="right"|5,933 (1952 list)
!align="right"|
!align="right"|
!align="right"|
!align="right"|
|- bgcolor="white"
!align="right" colspan=3|Turnout
!align="right"|70.15%
!align="right"|
!align="right"|
!align="right"|
!align="right"|
|- bgcolor="white"
!align="right" colspan=9|9 Preferential ballot; final count is between top two candidates from first count; intermediary counts (of 3) not shown
|}
analysis of preferential ballot - preferential ballot - 1st, 2nd, 3rd choices, respectively:
Ashby, Herbert 	    PC 	452 	- 	- 	  	
Gordon Hudson 	    CCF 	1,372 	1,420 	1,694 	  	
GIBSON, James Gordon 	    LIB. 	1,103 	1,335 	1,830 	  	
Olafson, Frank Conrad     SC 	1,065 	1,138 	- 	s an essentially rural riding, spanning the southern Cariboo and the mountain country west of Lillooet and the northern part of the Fraser Canyon.  It was succeeded by the Yale-Lillooet riding, which has been succeeded by Fraser-Nicola.

Members of the Legislative Assembly

Thomas Basil Humphreys - 1871-1875
Andrew Thomas Jamieson - 1871-1875
William M. Brown - 1875-1882  (Reform slate and from 1878 Opposition)
William Morrison - 1875-1878  (Reform slate)
William Saul - 1878-1882 (Opposition and from 1886 Government)
Edward Allen - 1882-1890 (Opposition and from 1886 Government)
Alexander Edmund Batson Davie - 1882-1890 (ran as Opposition, but from 1887-1889 sat as Premier)
Alfred Wellington Smith 1890-1894 (Government)
David Alexander Stoddart 1890-1894 (Opposition)
see Lillooet West and Lillooet East for elections in 1894, 1898, and 1900
Archibald McDonald 1903-1907 (Conservative)
Mark Robert Eagleson 1907-1909 (Liberal)
Archibald McDonald 1909-1924 (Conservative)
Albert Edward Munn 1924-1928 (Liberal)
Ernest Crawford Carson 1928-1933 (Conservative)
George Matheson Murray 1933-1941 (Liberal)
Ernest Crawford Carson 1941-1953 (Conservative)
James Gordon Gibson 1953-1956 (Liberal)
Donald Frederick Robinson 1956-1966 (Social Credit)

Election results 
Note: Winners of each election are in bold.

|-

|Independent
|Thomas Basil Humphreys1
|align="right"|45
|align="right"|44.12%
|align="right"|
|align="right"|unknown

|Independent
|Andrew Thomas Jamieson
|align="right"|36
|align="right"|35.29%
|align="right"|
|align="right"|unknown

|Independent
|William Saul
|align="right"|21
|align="right"|20.59%
|align="right"|
|align="right"|unknown
|- bgcolor="white"
!align="right" colspan=3|Total valid votes
!align="right"|102
!align="right"|100.00%
!align="right"|
!align="right"|
|- bgcolor="white"
!align="right" colspan=3|Total rejected ballots
!align="right"|
!align="right"|
!align="right"|
!align="right"|
|- bgcolor="white"
!align="right" colspan=3|Turnout
!align="right"|79.69%
!align="right"|
!align="right"|
!align="right"|
|- bgcolor="white"
!align="right" colspan=7|1  Often spelled "Humphries" in many contemporary histories.
|}

|-

|Independent
|William Chadwick
|align="right"|(2)3
|align="right"|(6.06%)
|align="right"|
|align="right"|unknown

|Independent
|Edward Kelly
|align="right"|(1)3
|align="right"|(3.03%)
|align="right"|
|align="right"|unknown

|Independent
|William Saul
|align="right"|(30)3
|align="right"|(90.91%)
|align="right"|
|align="right"|unknown
|- bgcolor="white"
!align="right" colspan=3|Total valid votes
!align="right"|(33)
!align="right"|(100.00%)
!align="right"|
!align="right"|
|- bgcolor="white"
!align="right" colspan=3|Total rejected ballots
!align="right"|
!align="right"|
!align="right"|
!align="right"|
|- bgcolor="white"
!align="right" colspan=3|Turnout
!align="right"|%
!align="right"|
!align="right"|
!align="right"|
|- bgcolor="white"
!align="right" colspan=7|2  To fill the seat-vacancy caused by the death of A.T. Jamieson 31 October 1872.
|- bgcolor="white"
!align="right" colspan=7|3  Incomplete returns.  Numbers cited are from Cariboo Sentinel 28 December 1872.
|}

|-

|Independent
|William M. Brown
|align="right"|51
|align="right"|32.90%
|align="right"|
|align="right"|unknown

|Independent
|Thomas Basil Humphreys
|align="right"|56
|align="right"|36.13%
|align="right"|
|align="right"|unknown

|Independent
|William Saul
|align="right"|48
|align="right"|30.97%
|align="right"|
|align="right"|unknown
|- bgcolor="white"
!align="right" colspan=3|Total valid votes
!align="right"|155
!align="right"|100.00%
!align="right"|
!align="right"|
|- bgcolor="white"
!align="right" colspan=3|Total rejected ballots
!align="right"|
!align="right"|
!align="right"|
!align="right"|
|- bgcolor="white"
!align="right" colspan=3|Turnout
!align="right"|%
!align="right"|
!align="right"|
!align="right"|
|- bgcolor="white"
!align="right" colspan=7|4  Resignations 26 September 1874 of T.B. Humphreys and W. Saul over a "dispute between the two gentlemen as to which represents the popular feeling of the district" (Victoria Colonist, September 29, 1874).
|}

|-

|- bgcolor="white"
!align="right" colspan=3|Total valid votes
!align="right"|241
!align="right"|100.00%
!align="right"|
|- bgcolor="white"
!align="right" colspan=3|Total rejected ballots
!align="right"|
!align="right"|
!align="right"|
|- bgcolor="white"
!align="right" colspan=3|Turnout
!align="right"|78.01%
!align="right"|
!align="right"|
|}

|-

|- bgcolor="white"
!align="right" colspan=3|Total valid votes
!align="right"|237
!align="right"|100.00%
!align="right"|
|- bgcolor="white"
!align="right" colspan=3|Total rejected ballots
!align="right"|
!align="right"|
!align="right"|
|- bgcolor="white"
!align="right" colspan=3|Turnout
!align="right"|63.37%
!align="right"|
!align="right"|
|}

|-

|- bgcolor="white"
!align="right" colspan=3|Total valid votes
!align="right"|n/a
!align="right"| -.- %
!align="right"|
!align="right"|
|- bgcolor="white"
!align="right" colspan=3|Total rejected ballots
!align="right"|
!align="right"|
!align="right"|
!align="right"|
|- bgcolor="white"
!align="right" colspan=3|Turnout
!align="right"|%
!align="right"|
!align="right"|
!align="right"|
|- bgcolor="white"
!align="right" colspan=7|2  Byelection caused by resignation of A.E.B. Davie upon his appointment to the Executive Council January 29, 1883.  Date given is day of return of writs, as polling day was not necessary.
|}

|-

|- bgcolor="white"
!align="right" colspan=3|Total valid votes
!align="right"|268
!align="right"|100.00%
!align="right"|
|- bgcolor="white"
!align="right" colspan=3|Total rejected ballots
!align="right"|
!align="right"|
!align="right"|
|- bgcolor="white"
!align="right" colspan=3|Turnout
!align="right"|55.37%
!align="right"|
!align="right"|
|}

7th General Election 1894

split to two ridings:
Lillooet East
Lillooet West

8th General Election 1898

Lillooet East
Lillooet West

9th General Election 1900

Lillooet East
Lillooet West

|-

|- bgcolor="white"
!align="right" colspan=3|Total valid votes
!align="right"|--
!align="right"|--%
!align="right"|
|- bgcolor="white"
!align="right" colspan=3|Total rejected ballots
!align="right"|
!align="right"|
!align="right"|
|- bgcolor="white"
!align="right" colspan=3|Turnout
!align="right"|%
!align="right"|
!align="right"|
|}

|-

|Liberal
|Mark Robert Eagleson
|align="right"|123
|align="right"|51.68%
|align="right"|
|align="right"|unknown

|- bgcolor="white"
!align="right" colspan=3|Total valid votes
!align="right"|238
!align="right"|100.00%
!align="right"|
|- bgcolor="white"
!align="right" colspan=3|Total rejected ballots
!align="right"|
!align="right"|
!align="right"|
|- bgcolor="white"
!align="right" colspan=3|Turnout
!align="right"|60.10%
!align="right"|
!align="right"|
|}

|-

|Liberal
|Mark Robert Eagleson
|align="right"|117
|align="right"|41.20%
|align="right"|
|align="right"|unknown

|- bgcolor="white"
!align="right" colspan=3|Total valid votes
!align="right"|284
!align="right"|100.00%
!align="right"|
|- bgcolor="white"
!align="right" colspan=3|Total rejected ballots
!align="right"|
!align="right"|
!align="right"|
|- bgcolor="white"
!align="right" colspan=3|Turnout
!align="right"|79.11%
!align="right"|
!align="right"|
|}

|-

|Liberal
|Stuart Alexander Henderson
|align="right"|82
|align="right"|28.83%
|align="right"|
|align="right"|unknown

|- bgcolor="white"
!align="right" colspan=3|Total valid votes
!align="right"|281
!align="right"|100.00%
!align="right"|
|- bgcolor="white"
!align="right" colspan=3|Total rejected ballots
!align="right"|
!align="right"|
!align="right"|
|- bgcolor="white"
!align="right" colspan=3|Turnout
!align="right"|71.98%
!align="right"|
!align="right"|
|}

|-

|Liberal
|John Bates Bryson
|align="right"|269
|align="right"|47.61%
|align="right"|
|align="right"|unknown

|- bgcolor="white"
!align="right" colspan=3|Total valid votes
!align="right"|565
!align="right"|100.00%
!align="right"|
|- bgcolor="white"
!align="right" colspan=3|Total rejected ballots
!align="right"|
!align="right"|
!align="right"|
|- bgcolor="white"
!align="right" colspan=3|Turnout
!align="right"|66.27%
!align="right"|
!align="right"|
|}

|-

|Liberal
|Albert Edward Munn
|align="right"|626
|align="right"|42.56%
|align="right"|
|align="right"|unknown

|- bgcolor="white"
!align="right" colspan=3|Total valid votes
!align="right"|1,471
!align="right"|100.00%
!align="right"|
|- bgcolor="white"
!align="right" colspan=3|Total rejected ballots
!align="right"|
!align="right"|
!align="right"|
|- bgcolor="white"
!align="right" colspan=3|Turnout
!align="right"|56.43%
!align="right"|
!align="right"|
|}

|-

|Liberal
|Albert Edward Munn
|align="right"|1,028
|align="right"|45.39%
|align="right"|
|align="right"|unknown
|- bgcolor="white"
!align="right" colspan=3|Total valid votes
!align="right"|2,265
!align="right"|100.00%
!align="right"|
|- bgcolor="white"
!align="right" colspan=3|Total rejected ballots
!align="right"|56
!align="right"|
!align="right"|
|- bgcolor="white"
!align="right" colspan=3|Turnout
!align="right"|80.28%
!align="right"|
!align="right"|
|}

|-

|Liberal
|George Matheson Murray7
|align="right"|927
|align="right"|44.06%
|align="right"|
|align="right"|unknown

|Co-operative Commonwealth Fed.
|John Morrison Smith
|align="right"|472
|align="right"|22.43%
|align="right"|
|align="right"|unknown
|- bgcolor="white"
!align="right" colspan=3|Total valid votes
!align="right"|2,104
!align="right"|100.00%
!align="right"|
|- bgcolor="white"
!align="right" colspan=3|Total rejected ballots
!align="right"|96
!align="right"|
!align="right"|
|- bgcolor="white"
!align="right" colspan=3|Turnout
!align="right"|66.29%
!align="right"|
!align="right"|
|- bgcolor="white"
!align="right" colspan=7|7  Publisher of Bridge River-Lillooet News and husband of Margaret Lally "Ma" Murray.
|}

|-

|Co-operative Commonwealth Fed.
|Robert Purvis Armstrong 
|align="right"|855
|align="right"|28.92%
|align="right"|
|align="right"|unknown

|Liberal
|George Matheson Murray
|align="right"|1,176
|align="right"|39.78%
|align="right"|
|align="right"|unknown
|- bgcolor="white"
!align="right" colspan=3|Total valid votes
!align="right"|2956
!align="right"|100.00%
!align="right"|
|- bgcolor="white"
!align="right" colspan=3|Total rejected ballots
!align="right"|57
!align="right"|
!align="right"|
|- bgcolor="white"
!align="right" colspan=3|Turnout
!align="right"|76.12%
!align="right"|
!align="right"|
|}

|-

|Co-operative Commonwealth Fed.
|Harry Grenfell Archibald
|align="right"|841
|align="right"|31.75%
|align="right"|
|align="right"|unknown

|Liberal
|George Matheson Murray 
|align="right"|791
|align="right"|29.86%
|align="right"|
|align="right"|unknown
|- bgcolor="white"
!align="right" colspan=3|Total valid votes
!align="right"|2,649
!align="right"|100.00%
!align="right"|
|- bgcolor="white"
!align="right" colspan=3|Total rejected ballots
!align="right"|29
!align="right"|
!align="right"|
|- bgcolor="white"
!align="right" colspan=3|Turnout
!align="right"|67.02%
!align="right"|
!align="right"|
|}

|-

|Independent
|William Wallace O'Keefe
|align="right"|204
|align="right"|5.48%
|align="right"|
|align="right"|unknown
|- bgcolor="white"
!align="right" colspan=3|Total valid votes
!align="right"|3,723
!align="right"|100.00%
!align="right"|
|- bgcolor="white"
!align="right" colspan=3|Total rejected ballots
!align="right"|125
!align="right"|
!align="right"|
|- bgcolor="white"
!align="right" colspan=3|Turnout
!align="right"|77.94%
!align="right"|
!align="right"|
|}

|-

|Progressive Conservative
|Ernest Crawford Carson
|align="right"|1,301
|align="right"|35.68%
|align="right"|1,847
|align="right"|56.60%
|align="right"|
|align="right"|unknown

|Co-operative Commonwealth Fed.
|Gordon Hudson Dowding
|align="right"|1,074
|align="right"|29.46%
|align="right"|1,416
|align="right"|43.40%
|align="right"|
|align="right"|unknown

|Independent
|James Coleman Finch
|align="right"|96
|align="right"|2.63% 
|align="right"|-
|align="right"|-% 
|align="right"|
|align="right"|unknown

|Liberal
|William Henry Okell
|align="right"|725
|align="right"|19.88%
|align="right"|-
|align="right"|-% 
|align="right"|
|align="right"|unknown

|- bgcolor="white"
!align="right" colspan=3|Total valid votes
!align="right"|3,646
!align="right"|%
!align="right"|3,263
!align="right"|100.00%
!align="right"|
|- bgcolor="white"
!align="right" colspan=3|Total rejected ballots
!align="right"|254
!align="right"|
!align="right"|
|- bgcolor="white"
!align="right" colspan=3|Turnout
!align="right"|77.94%
!align="right"|
!align="right"|
|- bgcolor="white"
!align="right" colspan=9|8 Preferential ballot; final count is between top two candidates from first count; intermediary counts (of 4) not shown
|}

|-

|Progressive Conservative
|Herbert Ashby
|align="right"|452
|align="right"|11.32 %
|align="right"|-  
|align="right"|-%
|align="right"|
|align="right"|unknown

|Co-operative Commonwealth Fed.
|Gordon Hudson Dowding
|align="right"|1,372
|align="right"|34.37%
|align="right"|1,694
|align="right"|48.07%
|align="right"|
|align="right"|unknown

|Liberal
|Gordon Gibson, Sr.
|align="right"|1,103
|align="right"|27.63%
|align="right"|1,830
|align="right"|51.93%
|align="right"|
|align="right"|unknown

|- bgcolor="white"
!align="right" colspan=3|Total valid votes
!align="right"|3,992
!align="right"|100.00%
!align="right"|3,524
!align="right"|%
!align="right"|
|- bgcolor="white"
!align="right" colspan=3|Total rejected ballots
!align="right"|170
!align="right"|
!align="right"|
!align="right"|
!align="right"|
|- bgcolor="white"
!align="right" colspan=3|Total Registered Voters
!align="right"|5,933 (1952 list)
!align="right"|
!align="right"|
!align="right"|
!align="right"|
|- bgcolor="white"
!align="right" colspan=3|Turnout
!align="right"|70.15%
!align="right"|
!align="right"|
!align="right"|
!align="right"|
|- bgcolor="white"
!align="right" colspan=9|9 Preferential ballot; final count is between top two candidates from first count; intermediary counts (of 3) not shown
|}
analysis of preferential ballot - preferential ballot - 1st, 2nd, 3rd choices, respectively:
Ashby, Herbert 	    PC 	452 	- 	- 	  	
Gordon Hudson 	    CCF 	1,372 	1,420 	1,694 	  	
GIBSON, James Gordon 	    LIB. 	1,103 	1,335 	1,830 	  	
Olafson, Frank Conrad     SC 	1,065 	1,138 	- 	

|-

|Co-operative Commonwealth Fed.
|Austin Kenneth Greenway
|align="right"|907
|align="right"|23.13
|align="right"|
|align="right"|unknown

|Liberal
|James Smith
|align="right"|959
|align="right"|24.46%
|align="right"|
|align="right"|unknown
|- bgcolor="white"
!align="right" colspan=3|Total valid votes
!align="right"|3921
!align="right"|100.00%
!align="right"|
|- bgcolor="white"
!align="right" colspan=3|Total rejected ballots
!align="right"|58
!align="right"|
!align="right"|
|- bgcolor="white"
!align="right" colspan=3|Turnout
!align="right"|72.97%
!align="right"|
!align="right"|
|}

|-

|Progressive Conservative
|George M. Behrner
|align="right"|336
|align="right"|7.84%
|align="right"|
|align="right"|unknown

|Liberal
|Cyril Clyde Keyes
|align="right"|923
|align="right"|21.54%
|align="right"|
|align="right"|unknown

|Co-operative Commonwealth Fed.
|John Kendrick Macey
|align="right"|1,331
|align="right"|31.06%
|align="right"|
|align="right"|unknown

|- bgcolor="white"
!align="right" colspan=3|Total valid votes
!align="right"|4,285
!align="right"|100.00%
!align="right"|
|- bgcolor="white"
!align="right" colspan=3|Total rejected ballots
!align="right"|282
!align="right"|
!align="right"|
|- bgcolor="white"
!align="right" colspan=3|Turnout
!align="right"|66.77%
!align="right"|
!align="right"|
|}

|-

|Liberal
|Henry Greer Castillou
|align="right"|977
|align="right"|23.15%
|align="right"|
|align="right"|unknown

|Progressive Conservative
|Thomas William Meagher
|align="right"|702
|align="right"|16.64%
|align="right"|
|align="right"|unknown

|- bgcolor="white"
!align="right" colspan=3|Total valid votes
!align="right"|4,220
!align="right"|100.00%
!align="right"|
|- bgcolor="white"
!align="right" colspan=3|Total rejected ballots
!align="right"|53
!align="right"|
!align="right"|
|- bgcolor="white"
!align="right" colspan=3|Turnout
!align="right"|65.33%
!align="right"|
!align="right"|
|}

In the 28th General Election in 1966, parts of the former riding of Lillooet became incorporated into the new riding of Yale-Lillooet, which has since been replaced by Fraser-Nicola

SourcesUSERPROFILE%\AppData\Local\Google\Chrome Cleanup Tool\Quarantine

Elections BC website - historical election data

Former provincial electoral districts of British Columbia